is a metro station on the Osaka Metro Tanimachi Line located in Asahi-ku, Osaka, Japan.

Layout
There is an island platform with two tracks underground.

Connections

External links

 Official Site 
 Official Site

References

Asahi-ku, Osaka
Osaka Metro stations
Railway stations in Japan opened in 1977